A buffet is a meal laid out on a table or sideboard so that guests may serve themselves.

Buffet may also refer to:

People
Buffet (surname)

Arts, entertainment, and media
The Buffet (Chardin), a 1728 painting by Jean Siméon Chardin
The Buffet (play), a 1968 Egyptian play by Ali Salem
The Buffet, a 2015 album by R. Kelly

Brands and enterprises
 Buffet Crampon, a manufacturer of musical instruments
 Buffets, Inc., American restaurant company, now known as Ovation Brands

Other uses
 Buffet car
 Buffeting, aerodynamic turbulence on a fixed-wing aircraft prior to and during a stall
 Sideboard, a piece of furniture, often called a buffet
 Strike (attack), or buffet, to strike repeatedly and violently

See also
Phoebe Buffay and her twin Ursula, fictional characters on Friends and Mad About You
Smorgasbord (disambiguation)